"South" is a jazz composition by Thamon Hayes and Bennie Moten. It was introduced by Bennie Moten's Kansas City Orchestra in 1924 and recorded again in 1928, when it became a national hit. It was Moten's most popular composition.

Originally an instrumental piece, Ray Charles (a pseudonym for Charles Carpenter) later wrote lyrics for the tune.

Notes

1924 songs
1925 singles
Jazz compositions